Business intelligence (BI) comprises the strategies and technologies used by enterprises for the data analysis and management of business information. Common functions of business intelligence technologies include reporting, online analytical processing, analytics, dashboard development, data mining, process mining, complex event processing, business performance management, benchmarking, text mining, predictive analytics, and prescriptive analytics. 

BI tools can handle large amounts of structured and sometimes unstructured data to help identify, develop, and otherwise create new strategic business opportunities. They aim to allow for the easy interpretation of these big data. Identifying new opportunities and implementing an effective strategy based on insights can provide businesses with a competitive market advantage and long-term stability, and help them take strategic decisions.

Business intelligence can be used by enterprises to support a wide range of business decisions ranging from operational to strategic. Basic operating decisions include product positioning or pricing. Strategic business decisions involve priorities, goals, and directions at the broadest level. In all cases, BI is most effective when it combines data derived from the market in which a company operates (external data) with data from company sources internal to the business such as financial and operations data (internal data). When combined, external and internal data can provide a complete picture which, in effect, creates an "intelligence" that cannot be derived from any singular set of data.

Among myriad uses, business intelligence tools empower organizations to gain insight into new markets, to assess demand and suitability of products and services for different market segments, and to gauge the impact of marketing efforts.

BI applications use data gathered from a data warehouse (DW) or from a data mart, and the concepts of BI and DW combine as "BI/DW"
or as "BIDW". A data warehouse contains a copy of analytical data that facilitates decision support.

History
The earliest known use of the term business intelligence is in Richard Millar Devens' Cyclopædia of Commercial and Business Anecdotes (1865). Devens used the term to describe how the banker Sir Henry Furnese gained profit by receiving and acting upon information about his environment, prior to his competitors:

The ability to collect and react accordingly based on the information retrieved, Devens says, is central to business intelligence.

When Hans Peter Luhn, a researcher at IBM, used the term business intelligence in an article published in 1958, he employed the Webster's Dictionary definition of intelligence: "the ability to apprehend the interrelationships of presented facts in such a way as to guide action towards a desired goal." 

In 1989, Howard Dresner (later a Gartner analyst) proposed business intelligence as an umbrella term to describe "concepts and methods to improve business decision making by using fact-based support systems." It was not until the late 1990s that this usage was widespread.

Critics see BI merely as an evolution of business reporting together with the advent of increasingly powerful and easy-to-use data analysis tools. In this respect, it has also been criticized as a marketing buzzword in the context of the "big data" surge.

Definition

According to Solomon Negash and Paul Gray, business intelligence (BI) can be defined as systems that combine:
Data gathering
Data storage
Knowledge management

with analysis to evaluate complex corporate and competitive information for presentation to planners and decision makers, with the objective of improving the timeliness and the quality of the input to the decision process."

According to Forrester Research, business intelligence is "a set of methodologies, processes, architectures, and technologies that transform raw data into meaningful and useful information used to enable more effective strategic, tactical, and operational insights and decision-making." Under this definition, business intelligence encompasses information management (data integration, data quality, data warehousing, master-data management, text- and content-analytics, et al.). Therefore, Forrester refers to data preparation and data usage as two separate but closely linked segments of the business-intelligence architectural stack.

Some elements of business intelligence are:

 Multidimensional aggregation and allocation
 Denormalization, tagging, and standardization
 Realtime reporting with analytical alert
 A method of interfacing with unstructured data sources
 Group consolidation, budgeting, and rolling forecasts
 Statistical inference and probabilistic simulation
 Key performance indicators optimization
 Version control and process management
 Open item management

Forrester distinguishes this from the business-intelligence market, which is "just the top layers of the BI architectural stack, such as reporting, analytics, and dashboards."

Compared with competitive intelligence
Though the term business intelligence is sometimes a synonym for competitive intelligence (because they both support decision making), BI uses technologies, processes, and applications to analyze mostly internal, structured data and business processes while competitive intelligence gathers, analyzes, and disseminates information with a topical focus on company competitors. If understood broadly, business intelligence can be considered as a subset of competitive intelligence.

Compared with business analytics
Business intelligence and business analytics are sometimes used interchangeably, but there are alternate definitions. Thomas Davenport, professor of information technology and management at Babson College argues that business intelligence should be divided into querying, reporting, Online analytical processing (OLAP), an "alerts" tool, and business analytics. In this definition, business analytics is the subset of BI focusing on statistics, prediction, and optimization, rather than the reporting functionality.

Data
Business operations can generate a very large amount of data in the form of e-mails, memos, notes from call-centers, news, user groups, chats, reports, web-pages, presentations, image-files, video-files, and marketing material. According to Merrill Lynch, more than 85% of all business information exists in these forms; a company might only use such a document a single time. Because of the way it is produced and stored, this information is either unstructured or semi-structured.

The management of semi-structured data is an unsolved problem in the information technology industry. According to projections from Gartner (2003), white-collar workers spend 30–40% of their time searching, finding, and assessing unstructured data. BI uses both structured and unstructured data. The former is easy to search, and the latter contains a large quantity of the information needed for analysis and decision-making. Because of the difficulty of properly searching, finding, and assessing unstructured or semi-structured data, organizations may not draw upon these vast reservoirs of information, which could influence a particular decision, task, or project. This can ultimately lead to poorly informed decision-making.

Therefore, when designing a business intelligence/DW-solution, the specific problems associated with semi-structured and unstructured data must be accommodated for as well as those for the structured data.

Unstructured data vs. semi-structured data
Unstructured and semi-structured data have different meanings depending on their context. In the context of relational database systems, unstructured data cannot be stored in predictably ordered columns and rows. One type of unstructured data is typically stored in a BLOB (binary large object), a catch-all data type available in most relational database management systems. Unstructured data may also refer to irregularly or randomly repeated column patterns that vary from row to row or files of natural language that do not have detailed metadata.

Many of these data types, however, like e-mails, word processing text files, PDFs, PPTs, image-files, and video-files conform to a standard that offers the possibility of metadata. Metadata can include information such as author and time of creation, and this can be stored in a relational database. Therefore, it may be more accurate to talk about this as semi-structured documents or data, but no specific consensus seems to have been reached.

Unstructured data can also simply be the knowledge that business users have about future business trends. Business forecasting naturally aligns with the BI system because business users think of their business in aggregate terms. Capturing the business knowledge that may only exist in the minds of business users provides some of the most important data points for a complete BI solution.

Limitations of semi-structured and unstructured data
There are several challenges to developing BI with semi-structured data. According to Inmon & Nesavich, some of those are:

 Physically accessing unstructured textual data – unstructured data is stored in a huge variety of formats.
 Terminology – Among researchers and analysts, there is a need to develop standardized terminology.
 Volume of data – As stated earlier, up to 85% of all data exists as semi-structured data. Couple that with the need for word-to-word and semantic analysis.
 Searchability of unstructured textual data – A simple search on some data, e.g. apple, results in links where there is a reference to that precise search term. (Inmon & Nesavich, 2008) gives an example: "a search is made on the term felony. In a simple search, the term felony is used, and everywhere there is a reference to felony, a hit to an unstructured document is made. But a simple search is crude. It does not find references to crime, arson, murder, embezzlement, vehicular homicide, and such, even though these crimes are types of felonies".

Metadata
To solve problems with searchability and assessment of data, it is necessary to know something about the content. This can be done by adding context through the use of metadata. Many systems already capture some metadata (e.g. filename, author, size, etc.), but more useful would be metadata about the actual content – e.g. summaries, topics, people, or companies mentioned. Two technologies designed for generating metadata about content are automatic categorization and information extraction.

Applications
Business intelligence can be applied to the following business purposes:

 Performance metrics and benchmarking inform business leaders of progress towards business goals (business process management).
 Analytics quantify processes for a business to arrive at optimal decisions, and to perform business knowledge discovery. Analytics may variously involve data mining, process mining, statistical analysis, predictive analytics, predictive modeling, business process modeling, data lineage, complex event processing, and prescriptive analytics. For example within banking industry, academic research has explored potential for BI based analytics in credit evaluation, customer churn management for managerial adoption 
 Business reporting can use BI data to inform strategy. Business reporting may involve dashboards, data visualization, executive information system, and/or OLAP
 BI can facilitate collaboration both inside and outside the business by enabling data sharing and electronic data interchange
 Knowledge management is concerned with the creation, distribution, use, and management of business intelligence, and of business knowledge in general. Knowledge management leads to learning management and regulatory compliance.

Roles 
Some common technical roles for business intelligence developers are:

 Business analyst
 Data analyst
 Data engineer
 Data scientist
 Database administrator

Risk 
In a 2013 report, Gartner categorized business intelligence vendors as either an independent "pure-play" vendor or a consolidated "mega-vendor". In 2019, the BI market was shaken within Europe for the new legislation of GDPR (General Data Protection Regulation) which puts the responsibility of data collection and storage onto the data user with strict laws in place to make sure the data is compliant. Growth within Europe has steadily increased since May 2019 when GDPR was brought. The legislation refocused companies to look at their own data from a compliance perspective but also revealed future opportunities using personalization and external BI providers to increase market share.

See also 

 Analytic applications
 Artificial intelligence marketing
 Business activity monitoring
 Business Intelligence 2.0
 Business Intelligence Competency Center
 Business intelligence software
 Business process discovery
 Business process management
 Customer dynamics
 Decision engineering
 Enterprise planning systems
 Integrated business planning
 Management information system
 Mobile business intelligence
 Operational intelligence
 Process mining
 Real-time business intelligence
 Sales intelligence
 Test and learn

References

Bibliography
 Ralph Kimball et al. "The Data warehouse Lifecycle Toolkit" (2nd ed.) Wiley 
 Peter Rausch, Alaa Sheta, Aladdin Ayesh : Business Intelligence and Performance Management: Theory, Systems, and Industrial Applications, Springer Verlag U.K., 2013, .
 Munoz, J.M. (2017). Global Business Intelligence. Routledge : UK.

External links 

 
Financial data analysis
Data management
Financial technology
Information management